Robert Earl Carter (July 27, 1927 – February 22, 2010) was an American Roman Catholic priest and LGBT rights activist.

Early life
Carter was born in Chicago, Illinois on July 27, 1927, the son of Earl and Ila Grace Smith Carter. The Carters were Protestants who worshiped in different traditions. Carter grew up in Lakewood, Ohio, and later Park Ridge, Illinois.

Career

Carter graduated from the University of Chicago in June 1946 and the next day was received into the Catholic Church as a convert. He entered the Society of Jesus in 1954 and was subsequently ordained as a Roman Catholic priest in 1963. He became a scholar on John Chrysostom.

Carter was gay, and became one of the first Roman Catholic priests in the United States to acknowledge this publicly after he became one of the founders of the National Gay Task Force in 1973 (later the National Gay and Lesbian Task Force).

Death
Carter died on February 22, 2010, at his residence at Fordham University in The Bronx, New York City, New York.

References

Further reading 
 

1927 births
2010 deaths
20th-century American Jesuits
21st-century American Jesuits
American LGBT rights activists
LGBT people from Illinois
Activists from Chicago
University of Chicago alumni
LGBT Roman Catholic priests
Converts to Roman Catholicism from Protestantism
Catholics from Illinois
American social workers
Columbia University alumni